Noel Hugh Robinson (born 11 October 1962) is a British Christian musician, who primarily plays and mixes Contemporary Christian Music style with gospel music. He has released five studio albums, O Taste and See in 1996, Worthy in This Place in 2001 with Nu Image, Garment of Praise in 2006 with Nu Image, and Devoted in 2013. His fifth album, a live album, Outrageous Love, was released in September 2015.

Early life
Noel Hugh Robinson was born in Willesden, London, England, on 11 October 1962, where he was raised in the black Pentecostal church, becoming a Christian, while he was a teenager.

Music career
Robinson's music recording career began in 1996, with the studio album, O Taste and See, released by Jubal Records. His second album, Worthy in This Place, was released in 2001, alongside Nu Image, with Kingsway Records. He release another album with Nu Image, Garment of Praise, in 2006, from One Voice Records. The subsequent studio album, Devoted, was released by Nu Image Music, on 2 July 2013. He will release, a live album, Outrageous Love, with Integrity Music, on 11 September 2015.

Personal life
He is married to Tanya Robinson, where they reside in Essex, London, England, with their children.

Robinsons early life and rise to British Christian music heights is covered extensively in the groundbreaking book British Black Gospel by Author Steve Alexander Smith.

Discography
Studio albums
 O Taste and See (1996, Jubal)
 Worthy in This Place with Nu Image, (2001, Kingsway Records)
 Garment of Praise with Nu Image, (2006, One Voice)
 Devoted (2 July 2013, Nu Image)
Live albums
 Outrageous Love (11 September 2015, Integrity Music)

References

External links
 Official website

1962 births
Living people
English Christians
British performers of Christian music
British gospel singers
English songwriters